John Henry Camp (April 4, 1840 – October 12, 1892) was a U.S. Representative from New York.

Born in Ithaca, New York, Camp attended the common schools, and was graduated from the Albany Law School in 1860.
He was admitted to the bar the same year and commenced practice in Lyons, New York.
He served as clerk of the surrogate court in 1863.
He served as prosecuting attorney of Wayne County in 1867–1870.

Camp was elected as a Republican to the Forty-fifth, Forty-sixth, and Forty-seventh Congresses (March 4, 1877 – March 3, 1883).
He was not a candidate for reelection in 1882.
He resumed the practice of law in Lyons, New York, where he died October 12, 1892.
He was interred in Grove Cemetery, Trumansburg, New York.

References

1840 births
1892 deaths
Albany Law School alumni
Republican Party members of the United States House of Representatives from New York (state)
Politicians from Ithaca, New York
People from Lyons, New York
19th-century American politicians